Nine Mile was a Canadian indie rock band, based in Toronto.  Founded in 2001, original members included: D'Ari Pouyat (vocals & guitar), Trevor Norris (Vocals & Guitar), Joshua Cowan (drums) and Dave Matthews (bass & vocals). The founding members only recorded one album together entitled "Run". During the recording of this album, percussionist Dave Tolley was hired as a session musician to play hand percussion. Tolley became a permanent member of the group shortly thereafter.  The original line-up performed frequently for 2 years, embarked on only one Canadian national tour, before dissolving. Trevor Norris, Josh Cowan, and Dave Matthews all left the band amicabley. Shortly thereafter, Tolley moved to Boston to study at the renowned Berklee College of Music. Nine Mile's primary singer/songwriter D'Ari Pouyat remained in Toronto. D'Ari and Dave continued working on material, sharing songs and ideas via internet.

Nine Mile evolved into the brainchild of singer/songwriter D'Ari Pouyat and percussionist Dave Tolley. Touring mainly as a duo releasing the band's second album "Close To Touch" in 2003, D'Ari & Dave performed frequently at festivals and concerts throughout Canada, Australia, New Zealand, and the United States between 2003 and 2006.

Currently residing in Prince Edward County is front man and songwriter D’Ari Pouyat. In 2004, the Nine Mile Duo comprised D’Ari and long-time collaborator, percussionist/drummer Dave Tolley began to tour internationally, honing their sound and releasing two albums, Close to Touch and The Almanac EP. In 2007, after one of many international tours, the duo took a break. While still making Nine Mile cameos, Dave became the full-time drummer for Xavier Rudd - longstanding friend to both bandmates. Meanwhile, the road had taken its toll on the enthusiastic front man and D’Ari felt it was necessary to regroup. Leaving behind the fast past life of Toronto, D’Ari relocated to the country. This change of pace and finding inspiration in the passion of several pivotal Canadian songwriters including Brian MacMillan and Melissa Larkin, encouraged him to write with unprecedented honesty. With a new location, direction and sensibility, D’Ari set out to create a record that truly reflected the time and space in his life. Calling upon some of his most respected friends and musicians to collaborate with, Country Porno Electric Fireplace is a courageously honest, layered mix of new and old influences that depicts the energy of every musician who helped fully realize each track. Thoroughly enjoying the process of collaborating with like-minded musicians on the new record, on any given night Nine Mile can now be experienced as a duo or as a seven-piece ensemble.

Over the years, Nine Mile has toured internationally, sharing stages with The Black Keys, Joel Plaskett, G. Love and Special Sauce, Gomez, Xavier Rudd, Cowboy Junkies, Blackalicious, Michael Franti & Spearhead, Sarah Harmer, Donavon Frankenreiter and Pete Murray to name just a few. The band will soon be announcing tour dates that are set to take place throughout Fall 2009 in support of the new record which will be released on Dread Rock/Xiola distributed via Conveyor/Universal Music Canada.

Recent touring partners include: Xavier Rudd, Donavon Frankenreiter, Blackalicious, Pete Murray, Ben Harper and more.

Nine Mile is signed to Dreadrock Records, a self-owned indie label. Dreadrock has licensed Nine Mile's recordings to Liberation/Warner Australia, and Entak/Universal Japan.

Discography
 Run EP (2001)
 Run (2001)
 Glance EP (2003)
 Close To Touch (2003)
 The Almanac EP (2006)
 Country Porno Electric Fireplace (2009)
 Summer EP (2011)

External links
 Nine Mile Official web site
 Nine Mile at myspace
 Live Recordings on archive.org

Musical groups established in 2001
Musical groups from the Regional Municipality of Waterloo
Canadian indie rock groups
2001 establishments in Ontario